Daniel Isaac Greenberg  (born September 1965) has been the Parliamentary Commissioner for Standards since January 2023.

Early life 
Daniel Greenberg was born in Golders Green, Northwest London and grew up in an Orthodox Jewish community. 

His early career included time working in the Lord Chancellor's Department, the Office of the Parliamentary Counsel, and the Office of Speaker's Counsel. He  recently served as counsel for domestic legislation in the House of Commons.

He has also served as editor of Stroud's Judicial Dictionary (2000–2016) and Craies on Legislation (2004–2016), general editor of Jowitt's Dictionary of English Law (2010–2015) and the Annotated Statutes and Insight Encyclopaedia, editor-in-chief of the Statute Law Review (2012), and contributing consultant editor to the Oxford English Dictionary.

Greenberg was appointed Companion of the Order of the Bath in the 2021 New Year Honours for services to Parliament.

In January 2021, he wrote an editorial in the Jewish Chronicle criticising some Haredi Jewish groups for not following COVID-19 restrictions, in which he suggests that "any community that tolerates  has no connection with Jewish law or values and has become simply a self-indulgent and dangerous sect".

Bibliography
 
 
 
 
  With Thomas Glyn Watkin.

References 

English barristers
1965 births
Living people
Companions of the Order of the Bath
English Jews
English legal writers
Civil servants in the Lord Chancellor's Department